Young Doctors in Love is a 1982 American comedy film directed by Garry Marshall. It spoofs a variety of medical shows (in particular, General Hospital) and has many guest stars from ABC soap operas.

The film stars Sean Young, Michael McKean, Harry Dean Stanton, Dabney Coleman and Patrick Macnee. It also features Demi Moore in one of her early film roles.

Plot

A group of eight young medical interns join the City Hospital surgery staff run by Dr. Prang, a brash and cynical surgeon leading an expensive and dissolute lifestyle. 

Meanwhile, old mafioso Sal Bonafetti is admitted to the same hospital under an assumed name after suffering a stroke; his son Angelo disguises himself as a woman or 'Angela' in order to watch over Sal, fearing retaliation by rival crime syndicates. 

Professional hitman Malamud is admitted to a bed next to Sal's in order to assassinate him, but his every attempt fails, causing Malamud himself to undergo painful and unnecessary treatment.

The resident who regularly checks in with Sal and Angela is Dr. Walter Rist. Over time he seems to develop feelings for "her", not knowing it's Sal's son in disguise.  

Residents Dr. Stephanie Brody and Dr. Simon August develop a relationship as the film progresses. Out to dinner, she has a strong pain in her side, but shakes it off, insisting it's nothing. 

As Dr. Phil Burns is working two other jobs to afford the residency, he's half-asleep when a dirty note is passed to him by head Nurse Norine Sprockett. Taken from a patient, Phil mistakens it as a come on. When he makes a pass at her, Norine slaps him. As a way of apologizing, he shows her the fox step, as his second job is as a dance instructor. Phil discovers Norine wears the key to the medications cabinet around her neck when he convinces her to get him an upper. 

Dr. Prang tells Simon he will schedule him for a basic surgery, and when he's asked to perform an appendectomy he chokes. He has a flashback to a joke played on him with a piñata on his birthday. Stephanie makes love to him on the operating table in the operating theater to cure him of his panic of the room.

Months pass, Sal continues to thwart Malamud's assassination attempts. At the hospital Christmas party, Stephanie and Simon announce their engagement and she collapses shortly afterwards. It's discovered that she is afflicted with a condition requiring a labor-intensive procedure. Simon forces a reluctant Dr. Prang to go ahead with the operation.
As it's complicated, the surgeons practise on a dummy.

In the meantime Phil, who's greatly increased a pill pushing business he's started by stealing using a copy of the medicine cabinet key, gets nabbed by the police. Norine had tipped them off once she'd discovered he'd been robbing the hospital. 

Stephanie's operation is scheduled, but at the last minute both the nurses go on strike and Dr. Prang loses it after his accountant says that he has to declare bankruptcy. Simon must operate without him, using his fellow residents as support.  

After some scares, the operation is ultimately a success.

Cast

 Sean Young as Dr. Stephanie Brody
 Michael McKean as Dr. Simon August
 Gary Friedkin as Dr. Milton Chamberlain
 Kyle T. Heffner as Dr. Charles Litto
 Rick Overton as Dr. Flicker
 Crystal Bernard as Julie
 Ted McGinley as Dr. DeVol
 Saul Rubinek as Kurtzman
 Harry Dean Stanton as Dr. Ludwig
 Hector Elizondo as Angelo
 Pamela Reed as Nurse Sprockett
 Dabney Coleman as Dr. Prang
 Michael Richards as Malamud Callahan
 Taylor Negron as Dr. Phil Burns
 Titos Vandis as Sal Bonafetti
 Patrick Collins as Dr. Walter Rist
 Patrick Macnee as Jacobs
 Haunani Minn as Nurse Chang
 Lynne Marie Stewart as Nurse Thatcher
 Richard Dean Anderson as the drug dealer (uncredited)

Reception

The film was a moderate box office success with over $30 million.

It received a positive review from The New York Times, which wrote that "there are enough bright moments to make this a passable hot-weather entertainment." It maintains a 31% "rotten" rating on Rotten Tomatoes based on 16 reviews.

References

External links
 
 
 
 

1982 films
1980s sex comedy films
1980s English-language films
Films set in hospitals
American sex comedy films
ABC Motion Pictures films
Films directed by Garry Marshall
Films scored by Maurice Jarre
Films shot in Los Angeles
Films produced by Jerry Bruckheimer
Films about physicians
Films about surgeons
1982 directorial debut films
1982 comedy films
1980s American films